Joy Suprano is an American actress best known for her lead role in the Apple+ show Best Foot Forward as well as her role in Hulu's Fleishman Is in Trouble.

Early life and education
Suprano was born and raised in Pittsburgh, Pennsylvania and graduated from Burrell High School where she was a competitive athlete and a member of the drama club. She moved to New York City just days after high school graduation to pursue her acting career. She earned a bachelor's degree in acting from the Juilliard School.

Filmography 
Since graduating from Juilliard School Drama Division in NYC and has had numerous film, television, and theater credits. Some of her starring and recurring television roles include "Hightown, "Almost Family," "Ray Donovan," "Law & Order: CI," "How To Make It In America," "Law & Order: SVU," and "Law & Order". Featured films include "Lonely Boy," "A Little Help" starring Jenna Fischer and Chris O'Donnell, and "We Are The Hartmans" opposite Richard Chamberlain. Miss Suprano received rave reviews for her theatrical role of Jan-The-Sly in the NYC premiere of "Yeast Nation, A Triumph Of Life" by the Tony award-winning writing team of "Urintown." She can be seen playing 'Cyndi Leffer' in HULU FX's limited series, "Fleishman Is In Trouble" opposite Claire Danes and Jesse Eisenberg, and is currently starring in the Apple + family comedy, "Best Foot Forward". Suprano will next be seen in the independent feature film "Magic Hour" which will be released in 2023.

Film

Television

References

External links
 

 https://www.fox43.com/video/entertainment/television/new-apple-tv-show-best-foot-forward-joy-suprano/521-7ef55a6c-bc84-4042-8035-f814c83efcb9

 https://www.cbsnews.com/pittsburgh/video/how-joy-suprano-went-from-pittsburgh-to-hollywood/
 https://deadline.com/2022/02/charmed-casts-shi-ne-nielson-joy-suprano-fleishman-is-in-trouble-1234931081/
 https://triblive.com/aande/movies-tv/tv-talk-lower-burrell-native-puts-best-foot-forward-point-park-grad-stars-in-sandman-quantum-leap/

 http://www.cinemablend.com/television/Donald-Sutherland-Is-An-Eastman-And-Boone-Returns-To-TV-16475.html

Living people
Actresses from Pittsburgh
Year of birth missing (living people)
Juilliard School alumni
21st-century American women